Hayley Cleghorn is an actress from England.

She started her career at an early age. 
She predominantly sees herself as a stage actress, but has been seen in popular British TV series such as Footballers' Wives and Prime Suspect. In 2006 she played the leading lady in the Bollywood film directed by Faisal Saif entitled Come December, which was an international award winner.  The film is yet to be released worldwide.

Filmography

Actress
 Come December (2006) ... She

Notes

External links
 Official website
 

Living people
Year of birth missing (living people)
English stage actresses
English television actresses
English film actresses